Teegan is a Cornish male and female name meaning 'special thing'. In Gaelic its meaning is 'little poet'.

See also

 Tegan, a given name of Welsh origin
 Teagan, a surname and Irish female or male given name
 Tagan (disambiguation)

References

Cornish culture
British Isles given names
Feminine given names